Jules Hesters (born 11 November 1998) is a Belgian track and road cyclist, who currently rides for UCI Continental team .

Major results

Track

2015
 National Junior Championships
1st  Madison (with Arne De Groote)
1st  Scratch
2016
 UEC European Junior Championships
1st  Scratch
2nd  Madison (with Gerben Thijssen)
2017
 National Championships
1st  Keirin
3rd Madison
2018
 UEC European Under-23 Championships
1st  Elimination
2nd  Madison (with Bryan Boussaer)
 National Championships
2nd Madison (with Fabio Van Den Bossche)
3rd Omnium
2019
 1st  Elimination, UEC European Under-23 Championships
 National Championships
1st  Derny
3rd Madison (with Fabio Van Den Bossche)
3rd Points
2020
 1st  Elimination, UEC European Under-23 Championships
2022
 1st Six Days of Rotterdam (with Lindsay De Vylder)
 3rd  Elimination, UEC European Championships

Road
2019
 7th De Kustpijl
2020
 2nd Gent–Staden
 4th Road race, National Under-23 Championships
2021
 3rd Omloop der Kempen
 7th Grote Prijs Marcel Kint
2022
 1st Grote Prijs Beeckman-De Caluwé
 8th Clásica de Almería

References

External links

1998 births
Living people
Belgian male cyclists
Belgian track cyclists
Sportspeople from Ghent
Cyclists from East Flanders
Cyclists at the 2019 European Games
European Games competitors for Belgium